Winfried Otto Schumann (May 20, 1888 – September 22, 1974) was a German physicist who predicted the Schumann resonances, a series of low-frequency resonances caused by lightning discharges in the atmosphere.

Biography
Winfried Schumann was born in Tübingen, Germany, the son of a physical chemist. His early years were spent in Kassel and in Berndorf, a town near Vienna. He majored in electrical engineering at the Technical College in Karlsruhe. In 1912 he gained a doctorate with high-voltage technology as his thesis.

Prior to the First World War, he managed the high voltage laboratory at Brown, Boveri & Cie.

During 1920, he was made a professor at the Technical University in Stuttgart, where he had previously been employed as a research assistant. He subsequently took a position as professor of physics at the University of Jena. In 1924, he was made professor and director of the Electrophysical Laboratory at the Technical University of Munich.

Brought to America under Operation Paperclip.
During 1947–1948 he worked at the Wright-Patterson Air Force Base in Ohio, USA and then returned to his post in Munich.

The Munich laboratory subsequently became the Electrophysical Institute, where Schumann continued working until retiring from active research in 1961 at the age of 73, though he continued teaching for a further two years.

Schumann died on September 22, 1974 in Munich.

Patents
 , Tube control, Winfried Otto Schumann, Sep 29, 1942.

External links
 50 Years of Schumann Resonance, Kristian Schlegel and Martin Füllekrug
 Examples of the Zeroth Theorem of the History of Science

German geophysicists
Academic staff of the Technical University of Munich
1888 births
1974 deaths